, short for Co-operative Grocer Chain, is a Japanese supermarket co-financed by the CGC, which operates a private brand names corporation.

Its group scale as of October 2007 consisted of 225 member firms, 3,261 member shops and a group revenue of ￥3,668,200,000,000.

References

External links
 C.G.C.JAPAN
 C.G.C.JAPAN 
 CGC song

Retail companies established in 1973
Retail companies based in Tokyo
1973 establishments in Japan